Golf & Mike, more often credited in Thailand as Golf-Mike, was a Thai pop duo artist consisting of brothers Pichaya "Golf" Nitipaisalkul and Pirat "Mike" Nitipaisalkul, formed under Thailand's biggest entertainment company, GMM Grammy.

Brothers are born from a French Chinese father and a Thai mother.

Members

History

2002–2005: Pre-debut activities 

In 2002, the two Nitipaisalkul brothers were auditioned into the 1st generation of G-Junior, a training project by GMM Grammy, Thailand's largest entertainment company. As trainees, Golf & Mike were trained in singing, dancing, acting, and language and they made an appearance at many GMM Grammy concerts. Golf & Mike along with other G-Juniors joined J-Asean Pops Concert 2003 (October 10) where the concert featured Johnny's Entertainment artists, Hideaki Takizawa, Jimmy, KAT-TUN, Ya-Ya-Yah, A.B.C, & Five. The G-Juniors also performed consecutively at Pattaya Music Festival in 2003 & 2004 (all featured Johnny's artists). From these concerts, Golf, Mike and other G-Juniors were spotted by Johnny's crews and later were invited to join the Thai-J Pop Concert in 2004 (Tackey & Tsubasa, KAT-TUN & A.B.C).

In 2004, Golf & Mike issued their first Thai concert performance as an opening act to Bird Thongchai McIntyre's For Fan Fun Fair Concert. The two boys with B-boy dancing at the middle of the stage started to gain their own fanclub. At the end of 2004, Golf & Mike were invited to join NEWS concert at Tokyo International Forum as special guests and early 2005 they were invited again in Ya-Ya-Yah concert in 2005. Golf & Mike performed "Epilogue" at these concerts and were called Thai Junior by Japanese press at the time.

2005: Debut 

It took 4 years before the Nitipaisalkul brothers finally debuted as Golf-Mike in October 2005 with their self-titled album, Golf-Mike. Dance-pop track "Bounce" was chosen to be the album's first promotional single, and it became a big hit in Thailand. The other tracks, "Ruang Lek Kaung Tur", "Ta Lok Dee", "Yah Len Bab Nee," and "Epilogue" were also widely accepted in the industry. It's noted that "Epilogue", a cover of Tackey & Tsubasa hits, was given as a present from Johnny Kitagawa for their debut album.

Golf & Mike's first album became a blast in the Thai music industry as their first nomination was the Most Popular Artist for the Year award for the Seed Awards 2006, which they also won in February 2006. In March, they were able to hold their first solo concert, Golf-Mike Let's Bounce Concert at Thunder Dome with an audience of 5,000 people.

2006: Special units in Japan and Thailand 

In June 2006, Golf & Mike were awarded Best Breakthrough Artist from the Channel [V] Thailand Music Video Awards 2006. Later that month, they showed up in Japan forming Johnny's Entertainment's first ever international unit, Kitty GYM along with popular J-pop figure, Tomohisa Yamashita. "GYM", stands for Golf, Yamashita and Mike, respectively with "Kitty" standing for the 4 Johnny's Jrs, Hiromitsu Kitayama (Kis-my-ft2), Kei Inoo (J.J. Express, later Hey! Say! JUMP), Shota Totsuka (A.B.C.), and Hikaru Yaotome (Ya-Ya-Yah, later Hey! Say! JUMP). GYM released one single, "Fever to Future" (フィーバーとフューチャー) as an official supporter of the Women's Volleyball World Grandprix. The single ranked No. 1 on the Oricon chart. Golf & Mike also performed in 25 rounds of Johnny's Jr no Daibouken Concert.

At the end of August, Golf & Mike teamed up with other G-Juniors including Chin, Guy, Happy, Madiow, J, Nut, Ken, and Ice as a group called "G-JR" (read as G-J-R) releasing an album, 10 Club.

On October 7, G-JR held a concert again called The Show Must Go on Concert By Golf-Mike & Friends at Impact Arena. The concert was first meant to be the Thai-J Pop Concert with Arashi & Golf-Mike but Arashi had to cancel its participation due to politic occurrences in Thailand at the time. At the end of the month, G-JR won a Virgin Hitz Award 2006 for Popular Vote New Band.

After finishing the promotion for their album 10 Club, Golf & Mike got back to the studios and started working on their second full-length album. By the end of 2006, Golf & Mike decided to release a special album 365 Days With Golf-Mike, This special album included a hit song, Kaub Koon Young Noi Pai and released second album on November 11, 2006.

2006–2007: One By One and Overseas albums 

They promoted the special album and worked in the studio for the second album until November 11, 2006, when their second album, One By One, officially launched to the stores. The first music video for the album, "Fight For You," took them three whole days to practice for Free-Running. Golf took his first step in song writing for the lyrics of "Sexy Girl".

On March 13, Golf-Mike was voted by Thailand's Entertainment Reporter Association in the Star Entertainment Awards 2007 as the "Best Group".

In June 2007, they released their first Japanese debut single, "Nippon Ai Ni Ikuyo". Two months later they released their debut Japanese album RIN under Johnny's Entertainment production.

In September 2007, Golf & Mike were invited to perform at the Asia Song Festival 2007 in Korea.  Along with this introduction, they released the Korea edition of their One By One album under SM Entertainment.

2008: Get Ready and TV drama debut 

Both Golf and Mike have taken the leading roles in a Thai series called Ubat Ruk Kaam Kaub Fah (Love Beyond Frontier) (directed and screen-written by Ping Lampraplerng) that was broadcast on Modern 9 TV in Thailand during the year 2008, and was later followed by a sequel "Ubat Ruk Kaam Kaub Fah 2."

In late 2008, the brother duo made their moves into Chinese music market by doing their first promo in Malaysia and launched their greatest hits album, Inspiration Greatest Hits.

In December 2008, Golf & Mike released the awaited third album, GET R3ADY featuring the collaboration song Let's Get Down with Khan Thaitanium.  Their interests in song writing were fulfilled in this album as Golf wrote and produced a song called "My Superstar" and Mike wrote a song called "You" which became a big hit.

2009: The 1st National Tour and International Appearances 

In May 2009, brother duo Golf & Mike released their first-ever Chinese album in Malaysia entitled "Get Ready 2", including 2 Chinese tracks, 同班同學 (meaning Classmate) and Inspiration.

Golf Mike and Ice Saranyu from GMM Grammy held their first concert in Tokyo, Japan on July 11, 2009, entitled Golf, Mike, Ice Thai Shiki Concert.

From October to November 2009, Golf Mike held their first-ever national concert tour around Thailand in 9 provinces, entitled The Closer Golf Mike National Tour Concert By Puriku. Their last concert of the tour was in Bangkok. To support the tour, Golf & Mike wrote & produced their very own song, "Let's Stay Together" and sang it as the closing song of this tour.

They were working in collaboration with the Korean duo Mighty Mouth to release an album that is to be sold in Thailand and Korea and has performed the song "No Matter" for the Star Stage TV program on the 29th of November 2009.

2010: New project 

Golf & Mike began the year with superb Michael Jackson dances at This Is It The Concert on February 20–21, the official tribute concert to Michael Jackson held collaboratively by Sony Music (Thailand) and GMM Grammy.  Golf & Mike had been known for being avid fans of Michael Jackson delivered acclaimed "Smooth Criminal" performances and also were joined by Chin, also former G-Junior, Peck Palitchoke and Dan Worrawet in the songs, "Billie Jean" and "Beat It".

Golf & Mike still remained commercial favourite stars as they opened the year with 2 new commercials including Fino with Super Junior members and Singto and then also endorsed Puriku Sicily Lemon.

By March 2010, Golf & Mike mentioned their next project of this year as a disclosed big surprise, rumored that they were going to take dance class in the USA before coming back with their 4th album.

They disbanded later and become solo singers.

2011: Solo album 

On February 1, 2011, Golf officially released his new solo single titled "Take Me to Ur Bed".

On March 1, 2011, Mike (D. Angelo) officially released his new solo single, "Ayo".

Discography

Studio albums

Special albums

OST

Compilations
 2007: Golf Mike Music Box Collection
 2008: Inspiration Greatest Hits (Malaysia edition)
 2008: Golf-Mike: Diary Hits

Singles/non-album tracks
 2005: Tong Ther Tao Nun (I'll Never Live Without You)
 2005: Kon Kon Deaw Kun
 2006: Fever to Future (フィーバーとフューチャー) - GYM
 2007: Nippon Ainiikuyo (ニッポンアイニイクヨ)
 2009: Let's Stay Together
 2010: Brighter Day (Klear featuring Golf Pichaya)
 2011: AYO (1st Solo Album of Mike)
 2012: ละเลย (1st Solo Album of Mike)
 2013: สดุดีมหาราชา - Golf (Various Artist)
 2013: เพียงชายคนนี้ ไม่ใช่ผู้วิเศษ - Mike (ไมค์ พิรัชต์) (Ost.รากบุญ)
 2013: ลูกไม้ของพ่อ - Golf Pichaya (เพลงประกอบละคร ลูกหนี้ที่รัก)
 2013: Break You Off Tonight - Mike D.Angelo (ไมค์ พิรัชต์) (Ost. Full House วุ่นนัก รักเต็มบ้าน)
 2013: Oh Baby I - Mike D.Angelo (ไมค์ พิรัชต์) feat.ออม สุชาร์ (Ost. Full House วุ่นนัก รักเต็มบ้าน)
 2013: FUNK ME (ฟังฉัน) - Golf Pichaya
 2014: ให้ฉันได้เป็นผู้ชายที่จะรักเธอ - Mike D.Angelo (ไมค์ พิรัชต์) (Ost.Full House วุ่นนัก รักเต็มบ้าน)
 2014: Wrong พื้นผิดเบอร์ - Golf Pichaya
 2014: จากนี้ - Mike (ไมค์ พิรัชต์) (ost.รากบุญ ตอน รอยรักแรงมาร)
 2014: ได้แต่คิดถึง - Mike (ไมค์ พิรัชต์) (ost. มายานางฟ้า)
 2014: New Beginning  - Mike D. Angelo
 2015: Take You to the Moon  - Mike D. Angelo
 2015: Kiss Me - Mike D.Angelo (ไมค์ พิรัชต์) feat.ออม สุชาร์ (Ost. Kiss Me)
 2017: 遥远的承诺 solo version (Ost. Delicious Destiny) - Mike D. Angelo
 2017: Together Forever (Ost. Mr. Swimmer) - Mike D. Angelo
 2018: Speechless - Mike Angelo
 2018: 你在我心中 - Mike Angelo
 2018: We were dancing - Mike Angelo
 2018: 和我跳舞 - Mike Angelo
 2018: Love Battle - Mike Angelo
 2018: Everyday (Ost. Mr. Swimmer)- Mike Angelo

DVDs/VCDs/live Concert
 2006: Let's Bounce Concert
 2006: The Show Must Go On Concert by Golf-Mike & Friends
 2007: One By One Concert
 2008: Golf Mike Get Ready Concert
 2009: "Variety Live Concert by Ice Sarunyu รวมมิตรใส่น้ำแข็ง" (guest)
 2009: The Closer Golf-Mike National Tour Concert
 2010: "This Is It The Concert"
 2011: "20 Years Christina Aguilar Concert" (Golf solo) (guest)
 2012: "1nvasion Exclusive Party" (Golf's Mini Concert)
 2013: "3 ทหารเสือสาว Limited Edition Live Show" (Mike solo) (guest)
 2013: "Bee Peerapat Natural Born Singer Concert" (Golf solo) (guest)
 2014: "2014 Top Chinese Music Awards" in China (Mike solo) (guest)
 2014: "Waterzonic electronic Music-Water Festival" (Mike solo) (guest)
 2015: "Ku Music Asian Music Awards" in China (Mike solo) (guest)
 2016: "Ku Music Asian Music Awards" in China (Mike solo) (guest)
 2018: "The Opening Ceremony of The 4th Annual International Jackie Chan Action Movie Week" in China (Mike solo) (guest)
 2019: “Star Action 2020 Starry Summit Ceremony" in China (Mike solo) (guest)

Photobooks

Golf & Mike have released 3 official photobooks.  All published by GMM Grammy's subsidiary, 'In Publishing'.
 2006: Unseen Golf-Mike
 2006: Golf-Mike The Backstage Show
 2009: Golf & Mike Live Photograph
 2014: Mike D. Angelo THE FIRST BREAKOUT

Filmography

Commercials
 2006: 12Plus Cutie, facial powder
 2006: YAMAHA FINO, motorcycle
 2007: iKeyclub.com
 2007: True Corporation
 2007: Save The World
 2007: My Style My Fino, motorcycle
 2008: Puriku, fruit white tea
 2008: i-mobile 625
 2008: i-mobile TV 626
 2008: Yamaha New Fino 2008, motorcycle with Korean boy-band Super Junior
 2009: Puriku Cool
 2009: Citra, Body Lotion
 2009: My Fino ... My Experience, motorcycle with Korean boy-band Super Junior
 2010: Amazing Fino
 2010: Puriku Sicily Lemon
 2010: Puriku goji berry {with Aum patchaapa}
 2011: Mike-Sumsung Refrigerator
 2012: Mike-Est Cola
 2013: Mike-Swensen's Ice Cream
 2014: Mike-Corolla Altis ESport  
 2015: Mike-Corolla Altis ESport Nurburgring Edition
 2016: Mike-Corolla Altis ESport and ESport nürburgring Edition
 2018: Mike-Mistine in China
 2021: Mike-MANSOME Vitamins Water

Awards and nominations

|-
| rowspan=1|2005
|align="center"| Golf & Mike
|align="center| Seed "Most Popular Artist of the Year"
|
|-
|rowspan=4|2006
|align="center"| Golf & Mike
|align="center"| Seed "Most Popular Artist of the Year"
|
|-
|align="center"| Golf & Mike
|align="center"| Channel V "Favorite Breakthrough Artist"
|
|-
|align="center"| Golf & Mike
|align="center"| Channel V "Best Song" – Ruang Lek Kaung Tur
|
|-
|align="center"| G-JR 
G-Juniors (Golf & Mike, Chin, Guy, Happy, Madiow, J, Nut, Ken, and Ice)
|align="center"| Virgin Hitz "Popular Vote New Band" 
|
|-
|rowspan=4|2007
|align="center"| Golf & Mike
|align="center"| Asia Song Festival 2007 "Best Asian Artist Award" / Appreciation plaque from the Minister of Culture & Tourism in Korea
|
|-
|align="center"| Golf & Mike
|align="center"| Seventeen Magazine "Popular Group Artist"
|
|-
|align="center"| Golf & Mike
|align="center"| Virgin Hitz "Most Popular Group Artist of the Year" 
|
|- 
|align="center"| Golf & Mike
|align="center"| Virgin Hitz "Most Popular Song of the Year" - ที่ปรึกษา"
|
|-
|rowspan=4|2008
|align="center"| Golf & Mike
|align="center"| Korean Ambassador Award
|
|- 
|align="center"| Golf & Mike
|align="center"| Audition Music Award "Best Band"
|
|- 
|align="center"| Golf & Mike
|align="center"| Sudsapda Young & Smart Vote "Young & Smart Band"
|
|- 
|align="center"| Golf & Mike
|align="center"| Seed "Most Popular Artist of the Year" 
|
|- 
|rowspan=4|2009
|align="center"| Golf & Mike
|align="center"| Top Awards 2008 "Best Group Artist"
|
|- 
|align="center"| Golf & Mike
|align="center"| TV Inside Hot Awards
|
|- 
|align="center"| Golf & Mike
|align="center"| Seventeen Magazine Choice Award "Seventeen Music Group Artist"
|
|- 
|align="center"| Golf & Mike
|align="center"| Virgin Greetz Awards: Greetz Hair
|
|- 
|rowspan=1|2010
|align="center"| Golf & Mike
|align="center"| Top Awards 2009 "Best Group Artist"
|
|- 
|rowspan=1|2011
|align="center"| Golf 
|align="center"| Music Library "Song of The Year" - I Can't Breathe
|
|- 
|rowspan=2|2012
|align="center"| Golf
|align="center"| Music Library Pioneer "Artist of The Year"
|
|- 
|align="center"| Mike
|align="center"| ลิขิตฟ้าชะตาดิน (Translation: Fated Heaven Fortune and Earth)
|
|- 
|rowspan=4|2013
|align="center"| Mike
|align="center"| 2013: The Great Awards "Best Rising Male Star 2012" - Raak Boon drama
|
|- 
|align="center"| Golf & Mike
|align="center"| 100 Most Spicy Idols 2013
|
|- 
|align="center"| Mike
|align="center"| Mekkala Awards "Best Leading Male Star 2012"- ลิขิตฟ้าชะตาดิน (Translation: Fated Heaven Fortune and Earth)
|
|- 
|align="center"| Mike
|align="center"| Rakangthong Award "People of the Year Award"
|
|- 
|rowspan=2|2014
|align="center"| Mike
|align="center"| The Best International OTP Cover of Hamburger Magazine 
|
|- 
|align="center"| Mike
|align="center"| Thailand Weibo Night 2014 & Thailand Headlines Person of The Year Award "The Leading Actor of Famous Thai TV Series" 
|
|- 
|rowspan=5|2015
|align="center"| Mike
|align="center"| Honorable awards in Thailand International Film Destination Festival 2015 
|
|- 
|align="center"| Mike
|align="center"| The outstanding filial piety award on National Mother Day 2015  
|
|- 
|align="center"| Mike
|align="center"| MAYA Awards "OTP"
|
|- 
|align="center"| Mike
|align="center"| Hamburger Awards "Best Buddy"
|
|- 
|align="center"| Mike
|align="center"| KU Music Awards 2015: The Hot Search Artist of Chart 
|
|- 
|rowspan=1|2016
|align="center"| Mike
|align="center"| KU Music Awards 2016: The Most Popular Annual Crossover Artist
|
|- 
|rowspan=1|2017
|align="center"| Mike
|align="center"| COSMO Beauty Awards 2017
|
|- 
|rowspan=4|2018
|align="center"| Mike
|align="center"| Chic style Awards 2018: Icon of the year
|
|-
|align="center"| Mike
|align="center"| Foreign Artist of the Year award from Sina Weibo in China 
|
|-
|align="center"| Mike
|align="center"| International Fashion Artist of the Year award from UNO X Young in China 
|
|-
|align="center"| Mike
|align="center"| Most Popular Overseas Artist of the Year award from DoNews in China 
|
|- 
|rowspan=4|2019
|align="center"| Mike
|align="center"| FEIA Awards 2019: Most Popular Foreign Artist award from JSTYLE in China
|
|-
|align="center"| Mike
|align="center"| Best International Star award from DIAFA in Dubai 
|
|-
|align="center"| Mike
|align="center"| Weibo Popular Actor award from Weibo Starlight Awards in Hong Kong 
|
|-
|align="center"| Mike
|align="center"| Overseas Outstanding All-Around Artist Award of Asia New Song List 2019 - Fresh Asia! in China 
|

Variety show/game show

Golf 

 2015 "Find The Wasabi Season 2" Norika's Hunters
 2016 MBO The Idol Game

Mike 

 2014 "The Generation Show" in China
 2014 "Star Family 2 days 1 night" on Sichuan TV channel in China 
 2015 "Happy Camp" on Hunan TV channel in China 
 2016 "Spring Festival Gala 2016" on CCTV-1,CCTV-4,CCTV News, CCTV-Español and CCTV-Français channels in China 
 2016 "Encounter Mr. Right" on Anhui TV channel in China
 2017 "Chinese Restaurant" on Hunan TV channel in China
 2017 "Happy Camp" on Hunan TV channel in China
 2017 "HNTV Mid-Autumn Festival Night 2017" on Hunan TV channel in China
 2017 "Day Day Up" on Hunan TV channel in China
 2018 "FeiChangJingJuLi Talk Show" on ShenZhen TV in China
 2018 "Spring Festival Gala 2018" on CCTV-1,CCTV-4,CCTV News, CCTV-Español and CCTV-Français channels in China
 2018 "The Amazing Idol" on Sohu TV channels in China
 2018 "Happy Camp" on Hunan TV channel in China
 2018 "Lipstick Prince" on Tencent TV channel in China
 2018 "NBA Fan day 2018 in Shanghai" in China
 2018 "Super Nova Games 2018" in China
 2018 "3X3 Sina Golden League (SGL) 2018" in China
 2019 "Day Day Up" on Hunan TV channel in China
 2019 “Lipstick Prince 2” on Tencent TV channel in China
 2020 “Global Variety Show" on CCTV 4 in China

References

External links

 Twitter:Golf
 Twitter:Mike
 https://web.facebook.com/golfpichayaofficial/ Official Facebook Golf Pichaya 
 https://www.facebook.com/M1KEANGELO1989/ Official Facebook Mike D. Angelo Fanpage 
 https://web.facebook.com/MikeDAngeloInternationalFanpage/ Mike D. Angelo International Fanpage
 https://www.youtube.com/c/MikeDAngeloInternationalFanpage Mike Angelo International Fanpage YouTube Channel

Sibling musical duos
Golf & Mike
Musical groups from Bangkok
Thai musical duos